Václav Aulický (born March 1, 1944 Prague, Czechoslovakia) is a Czech architect and university professor. He is a graduate of the Faculty of Civil Engineering of the Czech Technical University in Prague. His buildings have hi-tech and postmodern elements.

Biography 
Václav Aulický was born on March 1, 1944, in Prague. In 1967 he completed his studies in architecture at the Faculty of Civil Engineering of the Czech Technical University in Prague.

From 1967 to 1970, he worked at the Military Project Institute. Here, in Jiří Eisenreich's studio, he participated in the design of the Transgas building complex at Vinohradská 6 in Prague, which was built in 1972–1978. His task was, for example, the design of the cladding of the upper floors of high-rise buildings, where weather-resistant steel was used, produced since 1968 in Czechoslovakia under the product name ATMOFIX. During his time at the Military Project Institute, he also undertook several study trips. He was, for example, in Austria, the Scandinavian countries, or in Italy.

He has been working for Spojprojekt since 1974. Here he got to his own realizations. These were the Hošťálkovice Television Transmitter in Ostrava or the Telephone Exchange in Dejvice or Hradec Králové. At the end of the 1970s, he began working on the design of the Žižkov Television Tower.

He is a member of the Czech Chamber of Architects and since 1990 the Community of Architects of the Czech Republic. With his wife, architect Zdenka Aulická, he has two daughters and six grandchildren. He runs a studio at Spojprojekt, dealing mainly with telecommunications buildings and transmitters.

Since 2005 he has also been working at the Faculty of Architecture of the Czech Technical University as the head of the studio. He later habilitated there as an associate professor.

Realization 

Václav Aulický has a number of realizations to his credit. First he designed telecommunication objects, later also other buildings:

 Transgas, Prague, Vinohrady (1978);
 Automatic Telephone Exchange, Prague, Dejvice (1978);
 Hošťálkovice Television Transmitter, Ostrava (1980);
 Transit Telephone Exchange, Hradec Králové (1982) with Jindřich Malátek;
 Žižkov Television Tower, Prague (1992);
 Czech Television operating buildings, Prague, Kavčí hory (1995);
 Česká pojišťovna's administrative buildings in Pankrác (1997);
 Zirkon Administrative Center, Prague (1997);
 Rubín Building, Prague, Karlín (2001);
 Polygon House, Prague, Pankrác (2004);
 Anděl Media Center, Smíchov, Prague (2004);
 Diamond Point, Prague, Karlín (2005);
 City Point, Prague, Pankrác (2005);
 City Tower, Prague, Pankrác (2008) with Richard Meier and Aleš Papp;
 Trimaran, Prague, Pankrác (2018) together with Ernsten Hoffmann, Martin Tröthan;
 City Element, Prague, Pankrác (2019) in collaboration with Martin Tröthan and Jindřich Sová.

Gallery

References 

Czech architects
1944 births
Living people
Architects from Prague
Czech Technical University in Prague alumni